Lucas Auer (born 11 September 1994) is an Austrian racing driver. He is the nephew of former Formula 1 driver Gerhard Berger. He currently drives for HTP Winward Motorsport in DTM. He was a member of the Red Bull Junior Team.

Early career

In October 2011, Lucas Auer won the 2011 JK Racing Asia Series season championship. Then the young Austrian tested a F3 Euroseries car at Valencia, with his 52-year-old uncle Gerhard Berger looking on.

On 25 August 2012, Auer, driving for Van Amersfoort Racing, won the 21st round of the German F3 season, held at the 4.534-kilometre Lausitzring. He finished second in the Championship.

After the 4 season Mercedes Deutsche Tourenwagen Masters campaign, in December 2018 the Red Bull Junior Team announced that Auer would join the junior program from the 2019 season and he was confirmed to race the Super Formula Championship 2019 season. Auer was released from the program after a single season by "mutual consent", with team manager Helmut Marko citing Auer's age and lack of FIA Super License points as reasons for their split. He would return to DTM the next year with BMW Team RMR.

Racing record

Career summary

‡ As Auer was a guest driver, he was ineligible for championship points.
* Season still in progress.

Complete German Formula Three Championship results
(key) (Races in bold indicate pole position) (Races in italics indicate fastest lap)

Complete FIA Formula 3 European Championship results
(key)

‡ As Auer was a guest driver, he was ineligible for championship points.

Complete FIA World Endurance Championship results
(key) (Races in bold indicate pole position; races in italics indicate fastest lap)

Complete Deutsche Tourenwagen Masters results
(key) (Races in bold indicate pole position) (Races in italics indicate fastest lap)

† Driver did not finish, but was classified as he completed 75% of the race distance.

Complete Super Formula results
(key) (Races in bold indicate pole position) (Races in italics indicate fastest lap)

Complete IMSA SportsCar Championship results
(key) (Races in bold indicate pole position; results in italics indicate fastest lap)

Personal information
Lucas is the nephew of former Benetton, McLaren and Ferrari F1 driver Gerhard Berger. He is the son of Berger's sister Claudia, who runs a transport company in Wörgl in Tyrol – not far from Berger's own family business.

References

External links

 Official Website Lucas Auer
 

1994 births
Living people
Austrian racing drivers
People from Kufstein District
Toyota Racing Series drivers
Formula Masters China drivers
German Formula Three Championship drivers
Formula 3 Euro Series drivers
FIA Formula 3 European Championship drivers
FIA Institute Young Driver Excellence Academy drivers
FIA World Endurance Championship drivers
Deutsche Tourenwagen Masters drivers
International GT Open drivers
Sportspeople from Tyrol (state)
Prema Powerteam drivers
ART Grand Prix drivers
Super Formula drivers
WeatherTech SportsCar Championship drivers
Kolles Racing drivers
Mücke Motorsport drivers
Van Amersfoort Racing drivers
Drivex drivers
Strakka Racing drivers
Motopark Academy drivers
M2 Competition drivers
Racing Bart Mampaey drivers
Mercedes-AMG Motorsport drivers
BMW M drivers
EuroInternational drivers
HWA Team drivers
Karting World Championship drivers
Rowe Racing drivers
Nürburgring 24 Hours drivers
B-Max Racing drivers